Mahmudabad (also Romanized as Maḩmūdābād; also known as Maḩmūdābād-e Shārīn) is a village in Ak Rural District, Esfarvarin District, Takestan County, Qazvin Province, Iran. At the 2006 census, its population was 453, in 112 families.

References 

Populated places in Takestan County